The following is a list of school districts in Georgia; in most cases the list identifies the city or county in Georgia associated with the school district. These districts are a legally separate body corporate and politic. These school districts are run by either elected county boards of education or city school boards.

See also
 List of schools in Georgia
 List of charter schools in Georgia

References

External links
www.k12.ga.us—official Georgia Department of Education web site

 
School districts
Georgia
School districts